Leo Maury Gordon (born January 18, 1952) is a senior United States Judge of the United States Court of International Trade.

Education and career

Gordon was born in 1952 in Newark, New Jersey, attending school at Newark Academy. He received an Artium Baccalaureus degree in 1973 from the University of North Carolina. He received a Juris Doctor in 1977 from the Emory University School of Law. He served as an assistant counsel to the Committee on the Judiciary for the United States House of Representatives from 1977 to 1981. He served as an assistant clerk for the United States Court of International Trade from 1981 to 1999. He served as Clerk of the Court for the Trade Court from 1999 to 2006.

Trade Court service

On November 10, 2005, President George W. Bush nominated Gordon to serve as a Judge of the United States Court of International Trade, to the seat vacated by Judge Thomas J. Aquilino. He was confirmed by the Senate on March 13, 2006 and received his commission on March 16, 2006. He assumed senior status on March 22, 2019.

References

External links
FJC Bio
Judge Leo M. Gordon Biography on U.S. Court of International Trade website

1952 births
Living people
Emory University School of Law alumni
Judges of the United States Court of International Trade
Lawyers from Newark, New Jersey
Newark Academy alumni
21st-century American judges
University of North Carolina at Chapel Hill alumni
United States federal judges appointed by George W. Bush